"Blow" (stylized in all uppercase) is a song by English singer-songwriter Ed Sheeran and American singer-songwriters Chris Stapleton and Bruno Mars. It was released on 5 July 2019 through Asylum and Atlantic Records, along with "Best Part of Me", as the fourth and fifth singles respectively from his compilation album No.6 Collaborations Project (2019). "Blow" was co-written by Sheeran, Stapleton, Mars, Brody Brown, Frank Rogers, J.T. Cure, Bard McNamee and Gregory McKee. Mars produced the song and played all the instruments but the bass. "Blow" is a rock, blues rock and hard rock song. Lyrically, it is a dedication to a lover who leaves the singer crazy, mixed with gun references and sexual innuendo.

Music critics gave "Blow" mixed reviews, with some praising the singer's vocals and the song's hard rock sound, while others criticised the lyrics calling the sound dated. The song reached number 60 on Billboard Hot 100 and 39 on the Canadian Hot 100, being certified gold by Music Canada (MC). It also peaked at number three on the US Hot Rock & Alternative Songs, number four on Canada Rock and number 21 on the Australian Singles Charts. In the music video – directed by Mars and Florent Dechard – Sheeran, Stapleton and Mars are replaced by an all-female rock band. They perform the song in The Viper Room in front of a crowd of rock fans.

Background
During an interview with Charlamagne tha God discussing his No.6 Collaborations Project (2019), Ed Sheeran revealed that he had been inspired by Christina Aguilera's collaboration with Lil' Kim, Mýa and Pink on "Lady Marmalade" (2001). This led him to working with Justin Bieber and Bruno Mars. He said it would be "fun" to be on a record with them. The first person he reached out was Mars who said, "Let's just do a song. Just us." The track's title was first revealed on 18 June 2019, along with the guests appearing on it. On 2 July 2019, Sheeran teased "Blow"s release on Instagram.

Sheeran, Chris Stapleton and Mars wrote the track in a basement in Nashville. Sheeran explained that the trio did various songs and different things, but the single's rock sound came after working with Stapleton. Sheeran elaborated, "It was purely by accident with Stapleton  ... he played us the riff". Nevertheless, Sheeran and Mars had several arguments while working on the song, and "Bruno never stopped reminding him just which one of them had sold more records." Sheeran affirmed that people did not expect that kind of song from him and are surprised when they listen to it. Mars said it was a "privilege" working with Sheeran and Stapleton saying, "You never know what you're gonna land on when you collaborate with other musicians". He had fun working on the song with them, as did Sheeran.

Production and release
"Blow" was written by Sheeran, Stapleton, Mars, Brody Brown, Frank Rogers, J.T. Cure, Bard McNamee and Gregory McKee. Mars not only handled the production, but he also played the guitar, drums and the moog, while Brown played the bass. Charles Moniz and Joe Rubel, with engineering assistant Jacob "The Menace" Dennis, engineered the song. The track was mixed by Manny Marroquin at Larrabee Sound Studios, Los Angeles, with Chris Galland serving as a mixing engineer assisted by Robin Florent and Scott Desmarais. It was mastered by Stuart Hawkes at Metropolis Mastering in London.

"Blow" premiered on 5 July 2019, on Australian radio station KIIS 106.5. Atlantic and Asylum Records released the song on the same day, along with Sheeran and Yebba's "Best Part of Me" (2019), to digital download and streaming services in various countries. Atlantic released the single on 8 July 2019, to several radio formats including active rock, contemporary hit radio and Hot AC radio stations in the United States. On 10 July 2019, the single was re-released to active rock.

Composition

"Blow" is a rock, blues rock and hard rock song. It features a "chunky-fun" 80s heavy-metal "distorted electric guitar riff". The screeching guitar is accompanied by a lively drumbeat which "bounce[s] off [the] ears" and an extended shouted high note. "Blow" is an upbeat track, composed in the key of E-flat minor with a tempo of 92 beats per minute. The singers' vocal ranges span from the a low note of B4 to a high note of E6. They showcase "Stapleton's familiar howl, a soulful Mars", as well as an uncommon "rough-around-the-edges" Sheeran. AllMusic's Stephen Thomas Erlewine and Slant Magazine Seth Wilson, respectively, found the single to be loud and crazy; Erlewine described it as a "churning rocker". In the same vein, Alexis Petridis of The Guardian compared its energy to a mix of Led Zeppelin with Queens of the Stone Age. Sarah Murphy of Exclaim! called "Blow" a strange fusion of each artists' genre— pop, rock, soul—with "Led Zeppelin worship". Its sound evokes a "raucous quasi-Aerosmith screamfest".

Billboard Jason Lipshutz felt the guitar riffs and lyrics seemed to be inspired by the Black Keys' album Let's Rock (2019). Lyrically, the single finds the trio "serenading a love interest" who leaves them insane. These lyrics are mixed with references to guns and sexual innuendo demonstrated by Stapleton in his verses: "Supernatural woman, supernatural freak/Don't know what you're doin,' got me feelin' weak/Oh, I wanna call you fever, baby, you can set a fire on me/Hot damn, pop it like a pistol, mama". He also begs his girl to "Pull my trigger, let me blow your mind", while Mars sensually asks "Baby, tell me, what's your fantasy?" and Sheeran cries for having a child "with his woman". Ben Boddez writing for The Georgia Straight felt the recording was another example of the bleeding of music genres, which started with several newcomers dominating the top of the charts. Boddez argued that rock and roll could make its way into the mainstream by artists like Sheeran making "marketable pop music". The lyrics infused with gun imagery left the artists' fans and critics displeased because of high-profile shooting incidents at the time.

Critical reception
"Blow" has received mixed reviews from music critics. Jason Lipshutz writing for Billboard enjoyed the track as the trio are "vocal pros and adapt to the sound capably", handling the style of the single. Malvika Padin from Clash believes the song "makes up for every failing becoming the perfect end to a long-winded journey." Ben Boddez of The Georgia Straight found Sheeran to have the least influence on the track, but not "out of place", with Mars's production and guitar solo and "powerhouse vocals" being the main focus and Stapleton being comfortable on the "heavier mix". Boddez named the song as "pretty fantastic". All Music's Stephen Thomas Erlewine commended Sheeran's collaborations choices, as it not only reaches new audiences, but also the choice of a "pop star as big as himself." Mike Nied of Idolator lauded the collaboration as it was "surprising" the singers reached a "common ground on a rock-infused anthem". The Tennessean Matthew Leimkuehler was pleased and surprised with the "headbangin" recording. In a mixed review, Lucy Shanker from Consequence of Sound praised Sheeran's change in sound matching Stapleton's style. Shanker affirmed the song worked due to Stapleton being "one of the most talented musicians of this generation" and Sheeran having few verses.

On the other hand, Chris Willman of Variety said that despite "Blow" being "intriguing on paper" it is "pastiche", with the three artists being together on a "Rock of Ages" joke. Willman dubbed it as a "bogged down moment". NME Nick Levine criticized Sheeran's vocals as they sound like "terrible hair metal come-ons" and dubbed the guitar solo as ironic. Levine concluded that "Blow" is "a fun piece of dress-up". Seth Wilson from Slant Magazine was disapproval towards the lyrics, as they "make L.A. Guns seem like Nobel laureates". Wilson concluded that "Blow" shows the problem with the album, in that "Sheeran opts to avoid his strengths." Neil McCormick of The Daily Telegraph called the song "retrogressive and fake", with the single objective of expand "the demographic of everyone involved." Winston Cook-Wilson writing for Spin described the song as "assaultive" and "puzzling", saying that there is "nothing fun about the actual process of listening".

Commercial performance
"Blow" debuted at number 60 on the US Billboard Hot 100 with 26,000 downloads, 7.5 million streams and 1.5 million radio impressions in its first full tracking week. The single debuted at its number three peak on Hot Rock & Alternative Songs chart. This was Stapleton and Mars's first appearance on the chart, and Sheeran's first since 2013. The song also debuted at number one on Rock Digital Songs, marking each artist's first leader. It entered and peaked at number 33 on the US Rolling Stone Top 100. "Blow" debuted at its peak of number 39 on the Canadian Hot 100 and peaked at number four on Canada Rock, spending twenty-five weeks there. It was certified gold by Music Canada (MC). It appeared at number 31 in Australia and peaked at number 93 in Germany. On the Czech Republic and Slovakia single charts, the song peaked at number 53 and 56, respectively. "Blow" entered at its peak, number 21, on the Scottish Single Charts. It also charted at number 35 on the United Kingdom's Streaming Chart.

Music video
Sheeran announced the music video was set to be released on 30 June 2019, however it was delayed until 8 July 2019. It was directed by Mars and Florent Dechard and shot in three days. One of the actresses featured in the video, Jordan Kelly DeBarge, affirmed: "Please believe me when I say blood sweat and tears went into the making of this masterpiece".

In the music video, Sheeran, Stapleton and Mars are replaced by an all-female band including a former America's Next Top Model Cycle 23 contestant Cherish Waters, model/actress DeBarge (who wears a black cowboy hat) and former I Know My Kid's a Star runner up, Cheyenne Haynes. Waters, who leads the girl group, gets the crowd excited and lip-syncs the song along with the band in front of a crowd of rock fans during a "raucous" show at The Viper Room, a Los Angeles nightclub. The three vocalists are accompanied by Francesca Simone, Venzella Joy and Lauren Dais as bandmates.

Joshua Espinoza of Complex called the video "incredible". Winston Cook-Wilson writing for Spin described it as "tongue-in-cheek" and "energetic". Billboard Gil Kaufman found the music video to have "high-energy".

Personnel
Credits adapted from the liner notes of No.6 Collaborations Project.

 Ed Sheeran – vocals, songwriter
 Chris Stapleton – vocals, songwriter
 Bruno Mars – vocals, songwriter, producer, guitar, drums, moog
 Brody Brown – songwriter, bass
 Frank Rogers – songwriter
 J.T. Cure – songwriter
 Bard McNamee – songwriter
 Greg McKee – songwriter

 Charles Moniz – engineering
 Joe Rubel – engineering
 Jacob "The Menace" Dennis – engineering assistance
 Manny Marroquin – mixing
 Chris Galland – mix engineering
 Robin Florent – mix engineering assistance
 Scott Desmarais – mix engineering assistance
 Stuart Hawkes – mastering

Charts

Weekly charts

Year-end charts

Certifications

Release history

References

External links

2019 songs
2019 singles
Atlantic Records singles
American blues rock songs
American hard rock songs
British blues rock songs
British hard rock songs
Bruno Mars songs
Chris Stapleton songs
Ed Sheeran songs
Obscenity controversies in music
Songs written by Bruno Mars
Songs written by Chris Stapleton
Songs written by Christopher Brody Brown
Songs written by Ed Sheeran
Songs written by Frank Rogers (record producer)